Southeast Seminole Heights is a neighborhood within the Seminole Heights district of Tampa, Florida. As of the 2000 census the neighborhood had a population of 3,384. The ZIP Code of the neighborhood is 33603.

Geography
Southeast Seminole Heights boundaries are Hillsborough Avenue to the north, Interstate 275 to the west, Dr. Martin Luther King Jr. Blvd. to the south and 15th Street to the east.

Demographics
Source: Hillsborough County Atlas

At the 2000 census there were 3,384 people and 1,253 households residing in the neighborhood. The population density was  5,076/mi2.  The racial makeup of the neighborhood was 48% White, 42% African American, 1% Native American, 0.0% Asian, less than 7% from other races, and 3% from two or more races. Hispanic or Latino of any race were 23.0%.

Of the 1,253 households 39% had children under the age of 18 living with them, 31% were married couples living together, 18% had a female householder with no husband present, and 9% were non-families. 28% of households were made up of individuals. .

The age distribution was 28% under the age of 18, 23% from 18 to 34, 25% from 35 to 49, 13% from 50 to 64, and 10% 65 or older. The median age was 40 years. For every 100 females, there were 92.3 males.

The per capita income for the neighborhood was $12,906. About 44% of the population were below the poverty line, including 0.0% of those under age 18 and 7.0% of those age 65 or over.

See also
Neighborhoods in Tampa, Florida

References

External links
Southeast Seminole Heights'  official site
Southeast Seminole Heights Civic Association Neighborhood page from Neighborhood Link
Neighborhood Demographic Information

Neighborhoods in Tampa, Florida